Pierre-Michel de Lovinfosse (2 November 1747 - 10 December 1821) was a painter from what is now Belgium. He was born and died in Liège and - with Théodore-Edmond Plumier, Jean-Baptiste Coclers, Nicolas Henri Joseph de Fassin, Léonard Defrance and Paul-Joseph Delcloche - was one of the main Baroque and Rococo painters in the Principality of Liège.

He married Marie-Élisabeth Dodémont, a colour merchant and widow of the flower painter Dieudonné Deneux. He was also a nephew of the painter Paul-Joseph Delcloche.

Sources
https://web.archive.org/web/20070902210124/http://balat.kikirpa.be/DPB/FR/FMPro?-db=Dictionnaire.fp5&-lay=web&-format=Detail_notice.htm&ID_dpb=1597&-find

18th-century painters from the Prince-Bishopric of Liège
1747 births
1821 deaths